Veweziwa Kotjipati (born September 28, 1992) is a Namibian women's football defender who plays as a right back for Tus Lipperode in Germany. She has also been utilised as a midfielder or striker.

Kotjipati formerly played for JS Academy, a team that plays in the Namibia Women's Super League. She started in athletics at her school El Dorado High School in Windhoek before she became a footballer.

Kotjipati is also a member of the Namibian women's soccer team.

Club career

Kotjipati recalls playing her first competitive games in the Nawisa Cup. During the time she was at JS Academy beginning in 2009, her talent was noticed which later allowed her to join the senior national side from 2010 onward. After a couple of good showings with Academy, she then joined the German women's sixth division team, SJC Hövelriege.

Kotjipati joined SJC Hövelriege in 2012, where she managed to score 12 goals in the two seasons that she played for the club. In her first season, she had several difficulties adapting to the new German playing style which resulted in some red card situations. She eventually managed to adapt and became one of the top scorers in the league in her second season.

In 2013, Kotjipati and another Brave Gladiator, Stacy Naris, joined Tus Lipperode, a team that plays in the German fourth-tier league.

International career

In 2009, Kotjipati joined the Namibian national U-17 women's team and later the Young Gladiators U-20 squad. She joined the Brave Gladiators in 2010, whom she currently represents. She is one of the few Namibian women's footballers currently plying their trade overseas.

Honours
JS Academy
 Namibia Women's Super League: 2011/12

Arminia Bielefeld
 Frauen-Regionalliga: 2015/16

References
http://www.namibian.com.na/index.php?id=28&tx_ttnews%5Btt_news%5D=93623&no_cache=1
http://nfa.org.na/?q=node/682
http://www.republikein.com.na/sport/u-20-women-prepare-for-ghana.142648.php
 Brave Gladiators
http://allafrica.com/stories/201207040828.html
http://www.nfa.org.na/?q=node/1275
http://sun.com.na/content/local-sport/mother-all-ties-super-league
http://www.namibiasport.com.na/node/25198
http://www.namibian.com.na/index.php?id=28&tx_ttnews%5Btt_news%5D=81937&no_cache=1imgurl= 
http://www.thevillager.com.na/news_article.php?id=852&title=Pregnant%20Gladiator%20costs%20team%20against%20Tanzania
http://www.nfa.org.na/?q=node/909

1992 births
Living people
Namibian women's footballers
Women's association football defenders
Footballers from Windhoek
Namibia women's international footballers
Namibian expatriate women's footballers
Expatriate women's footballers in Germany
Namibian expatriate sportspeople in Germany